Clifford E. Rishell (October 10, 1890 – January 14, 1971) was an American politician who served as the Mayor of Oakland from 1949 to 1961.

References

1890 births
1971 deaths
Mayors of Oakland, California
California Republicans